The 2017 Breeders' Cup Challenge series provided winners of the designated races an automatic "Win and You're In" Berth in the 2017 Breeders' Cup. Races were chosen by the Breeders' Cup organization and included key prep races in the various Breeders' Cup divisions from around the world.

Summary
On April 12, 2017, the Breeders Cup organization announced that the 2017 Breeders' Cup Challenge would consist of 81 races from 13 countries. Compared to the 2016 Challenge Series, three races were added: the Belmont Sprint Championship Stakes, the Highlander Stakes and the First Lady Stakes. The Gold Cup at Santa Anita, Belmont Oaks and Canadian Stakes were discontinued from the series.

Fifty pre-entrants in the 2017 Breeders' Cup qualified via the Challenge series, which was particularly important as seven of the Breeders' Cup races were oversubscribed. A maximum of 14 horses (12 in the Turf Sprint) are allowed to start in each race. Winners of the Challenge races are given automatic entries, while other pre-entries are ranked by a points system and the judgement of a panel of experts.

A few challenge series winners could not compete at the 2017 Breeders' Cup due to injury or retirement. Two-time Eclipse Award winner Songbird qualified for the Distaff by winning the Ogden Phipps Stakes but was retired in August due to injury.  Bal a Bali, winner of the Shoemaker Mile Stakes, was retired in October because he was not training at a high enough level. Ulysses was a late scratch due to an ankle injury.

Five winners of Challenge series races went on to win their respective division at the Breeders' Cup:
 Gun Runner, who won the Classic, qualified by winning both the Stephen Foster and Whitney Handicap
 Forever Unbridled won the Distaff after automatically qualifying with victories in both the Fleur de Lis and Personal Ensign
 Rushing Fall qualified in the Jessamine Stakes then went on to win the Juvenile Turf
 Roy H won the Santa Anita Sprint Championship and the Sprint
World Approval won both the Woodbine Mile and Breeders' Cup Mile

Winners
The winners of the 2017 Breeders' Cup Challenge series races are shown below. The last column shows if the winner was subsequently pre-entered in the corresponding Breeders' Cup race and if so, whether they finished in the top three positions.

References

Breeders' Cup Challenge
Breeders' Cup Challenge series
Breeders' Cup